

Western Front
Includes land and sea operations relating to north-west Europe, but excludes:
 purely naval operations in the adjoining waters (see: List of World War II military operations - Atlantic Ocean)
 operations in Scandinavia (Denmark, Finland, Norway and Sweden), Iceland and Greenland (see: Military operations in Scandinavia and Iceland during World War II)
 operations in the Mediterranean and Italy (see: World War II operations in the Mediterranean region).

1935–1938
 Fall Rot ("Case Red") (1935)  — overview of defense planning in tandem with Fall Blau. Rot covered defense in the west in the event of military action in the east (Fall Blau).
 Fall Blau ("Case Blue") (1935)  — overview of defense planning in tandem with Fall Rot.
 Fall Otto ("Case Otto") (1937)  — plan to occupy Austria.
 Fall Richard ("Case Richard") (1937)  — Contingency planning for Soviet/communist takeover in Spain.
 Fall Grün ("Case Green") (1938)  — plan for invasion of Czechoslovakia.

1939
 Fall Weiss ("Case White") (1939) — invasion of Poland

1940
 Aerial (1940)   — Allied retreat from France using ports between Cherbourg and the Spanish frontier.
 Ambassador (1940)  — commando raid on Guernsey
 Attila (1940)  — German seizure and occupation of Vichy France, without Italian support. See also Fall Anton ("Case Anton") and Lila.
 Cycle (1940)     — British and Allied evacuation from Le Havre
 Dynamo (1940)    — British & Allied evacuation from Dunkirk.
 Fall Gelb ("Case Yellow") (1939–40)  — offensive against the Netherlands, Belgium and Luxembourg.
 Fall Rot ("Case Red") (1939–40)  — invasion of France and rout of British Expeditionary Force
 Grünpfeil (Green Arrow) (1940)  — invasion of British held Channel Islands (1940)
 Granit (Granite) (1940)  — Fallschirmjäger capture of Fort Eben-Emael in Belgium
 Mondscheinsonate ("Moonlight Sonata") (1940)  — Luftwaffe raid on Coventry
 Royal Marine (1940)  — Dropping of naval mines into the Rhine (originally Operation Marine)
 Seelöwe ("Sealion") (1940)  — planned invasion of Britain
 Adlerangriff ("Eagle Attack")   — Axis effort to destroy the RAF prior to invasion. Preceded by attacks on shipping known as "Kanalkampf" (Channel Battle). Aerial battles during the period were later dubbed the Battle of Britain.
 Fall Grün ("Case Green") (1940)  — planned invasion of Ireland as part of Seelöwe
 Herbstreise ("Autumn Journey")  — planned/diversionary invasion of Scotland as part of Seelöwe.
 Tannenbaum ("Christmas Tree") (1940)  — planned invasion of Switzerland.
 XD (1940)  — a series of demolition operations to prevent capture of oil installations and stocks by the Germans

1941
 Chess (1941)  — commando raid on Ambleteuse, Pas-de-Calais, France
 Colossus (1941)  — Feb. 10, commando raid on Tragino aqueduct near Calitri, Italy.

1942
 Aflame (1942)   — commando raid on Berck  in France
 Aquatint (1942)  — commando raid on Normandy in France
 Barricade (1942)  — commando raid on Pointe de Saire south of Barfleur in France
 Basalt (1942)  — commando raid on Sark in the Channel islands
 Batman (1942)  — commando raid near Cherbourg in France
 Biting (1942)  — commando raid on Bruneval radar site in France
 Bolero (1942)  — build-up of US forces and matériel for Roundup. Later utilized during Torch and Overlord.
 Branford (1942)  — commando raid on Burhou in the Channel islands
 Zerberus  — ("Cerberus") (1942) — break-out of German capital ships from Brest later dubbed the "Channel Dash".
 Chariot (1942)  — British raid on Saint Nazaire.
 Dryad (1942)  — commando raid on Casquets lighthouse in the Channel islands
 Fahrenheit (1942)  — commando raid at Pointe de Plouezec on the north Brittany coast
 Fall Anton (1942)   —  German occupation of Vichy France: Attila renamed, with Italian support.
 Frankton (1942)  — commando raid on shipping in Bordeaux.
 Jubilee (1942)   — repelled raid on Dieppe. See Also Operation Rutter.
 Abercrombie (1942)  — raid on Hardelot in preparation for Jubilee.
 Cauldron (1942)  — raid on Varengeville in support of Jubilee.
 Lila (1942)  — plan to capture French fleet at Toulon.
 Millennium (1942)  — British 1000 bomber raid on Cologne.
 Outward (1942–44) ; free balloon attacks on Germany.
 Roundup (1942)  — plan to invade Europe in event of German or Soviet collapse. Later abandoned in favor of Torch landings. Planning for Roundup included;
 Sledgehammer (1942) — establishment of beachhead in Cherbourg or Brest.
 Roundhammer — revised planning for Roundup.
 Sickle (1942)  — build-up of US air forces in UK
 Plan W (1942)   — planning between Allies and neutral Éire (Ireland) to deal with Fall Grün.

1943
 Bellicose (1943)  — British bombing mission against Friedrichshafen and La Spezia.
 Bolero (1943/1944)   — build-up of US forces and matériel in preparation for Allied invasion of France.
 Chastise (1943)  — bombing of Ruhr area dams popularly known as the "Dambusters" raid.
 Corona (1943)  — bombing raid on Kassel, Germany.
 Constellation (1943)  — one of several proposals to retake the Channel Islands;
 Condor (1943)  —  proposal to retake Jersey
 Concertina (1943)  —  proposal to retake Alderney
 Coverlet (1943)  —  proposal to retake Guernsey
 Crossbow (1943–1944)  — plan to destroy rocket production and launch sites. See Also Pointblank.
 Hydra (1943)  — bombing of Peenemünde rocket research center.
 Double Strike (1943)  — bombing of Regensburg and Schweinfurt.
 Huckaback (1943)  — commando raid on Herm in the Channel Islands
 Project Habakkuk (1943)  — project to construct an aircraft carrier from ice.
 Pointblank (1943)   — umbrella for bombing offensive by USAAF and RAF in preparation for Overlord.
 Gomorrah (1943)  — sequence of air raids on Hamburg.
 Rankin (1943)  — planned liberation of the Channel Islands

1944
 Abel (1944)  — harassment of German retreat in France
 Astonia (1944)   — assault on Le Havre
 Axehead (1944)  — proposed assault crossing of the lower Seine and capture of Le Havre and Rouen (superseded by Astonia)
 Benson (1944)  — reconnaissance mission by Belgian SAS near Amiens
 Bergbang (1944)  — unsuccessful mission by Belgian SAS east of River Meuse
 Brutus (1944)  — mission by Belgian SAS in Ardennes to arm local resistance and reinforce SAS forces
 Bulbasket (1944)  — SAS operation to prevent German reinforcements moving from southern France to Normandy
 Bunyan (1944)  — disruption mission by Belgian SAS in Chartres area
 Caliban (1944)  — mission by Belgian SAS near Leopoldsburg to disrupt German communications
 Chaucer (1944)  — Belgian SAS operation near Le Mans to harry German retreat
 Clipper (1944)   — Allied assault on Siegfried Line at Geilenkirchen.
 Constellation (1944)  — occupation of Venray and Venlo by British VIII Corps.
 Aintree (1944)  — occupation of Overloon and Venray by British 3rd Infantry Division.
 Cooney (1944)  — French SAS operation in Brittany to cut railway lines
 Derry (1944)  — SAS operation near Le Mans to disrupt German retreat to Brest
 Diver (1944)  — Defence of London against V-1 attack.
 Fabian (1944)  — Belgian SAS reconnaissance operation around Arnhem (also involved in recovery of British paratroops after Operation Market Garden)
 Franklin (1944)  — French SAS operation in the Ardennes in support of the US VIII Corps
 Fusilade (1944)  — capture of Dieppe
 Gaff (1944)  — SAS operation near Rambouillet to kill or capture Field Marshal Erwin Rommel, but which instead destroyed trains and attacked a German headquarters
 Gain (1944)  — SAS successful SAS operation southwest of Paris to disrupt enemy communications
 Gatwick (1944) — precursor of Operation Veritable
 Gobbo (1944)  — Belgian SAS intelligence gathering operation in northern Holland, near Drente
 Guildford  — 15th (Scottish) Infantry Division capture of Blerick
 Haft (1944)  — Special Air Service (SAS) intelligence gathering mission near Le Mans.
 Haggard (1944)   — SAS operation near Bourges
 Hardy (1944) — SAS information gathering operation near Dijon
 Harrod (1944)  — French SAS operation in the Saone et Loire in support of the US 3rd Army
 Houndsmith (1944)  — Special Air Service (SAS) action near Dijon.
 Houndsworth (1944)   — Special Air Service (SAS) campaign in and around Morvan.
 Hurricane (1944)   — Bombing of Ruhr. See Also Chastise.
 Independence (1944)   — clearance of German garrisons on the Gironde estuary (postponed, later revived as Operation Venerable)
 Infatuate (1944)    capture of Walcheren Island — final phase of the Battle of the Scheldt.
 Jedburgh (1944)      — Airdrop of operatives into France, Belgium and the Netherlands to conduct sabotage and guerrilla warfare, and to lead the local resistance forces in actions against the Germans.
 Jericho (1944)  — air-raid on Amiens prison to release French Resistance prisoners
 Jockworth (1944)  — French SAS operation near Lyons to impede German movements and bolster local Resistance; became active in the fighting in Lyons
 Kipling (1944)  — British SAS action near Auxerre to aid Allied airborne landings in Orleans Gap; these were cancelled and the SAS harassed the enemy in support of allied ground advance
 Loyton (1944)  — unsuccessful large SAS action in Vosges mountains.
 Lüttich (1944)  — German counter-offensive at Mortain.
 Mallard (Maas)  — British XII Corps' advance to the Maas
 Marine (1944)  — Dropping of naval mines into the Rhine
 Market Garden (1944)    — Allied land and airborne attempt to cross the lower Rhine.
 Comet (1944)  — early draft of Market Garden
 Berlin (1944)   — withdrawal of British 1st Airborne.
 Marshall (1944)  — French SAS mission to harass enemy and stiffen local resistance around Correze
 Moses (1944)  — Free French SAS action around Poitiers
 Newton (1944)  — Free French SAS action in Burgundy, France
 Noah (1944)  — response to blowing of river dykes near Nijmegen and consequential flooding
 Nutcracker  — British VIII Corps' advance to the Maas
 Olive (1944)    — offensive against the Gothic Line.
 Overlord (1944)     — invasion of Normandy, France. See also Pointblank.
 Aberlour (1944)  — cancelled follow-up to Mitten.
 Astonia (1944)    — assault on Le Havre
 Bluecoat (1944)  — Launched to support Operation Cobra
 Bodyguard — deception plan, including:
 Fortitude (1944) —
 Skye
 Fortitude (1944) — two deception operations to mislead over location of landings
 Glimmer (1944) — feint towards Pas-de-Calais
 Hambone (1944) — also known as Copperhead
 Jael
 Quicksilver
 Zeppelin (1944)  — deception plan to depict an amphibious landing on Crete, western Greece, or the Romanian Black Sea coast
 Charnwood (1944)   — assault on Caen.
 Chicago  — Allied airdrop
 Cobra (1944)  — breakout from Normandy.
 Dunhill (1944)  — SAS reconnaissance action in support of Cobra.
 Cooney (1944)  — Free French SAS action in St Malo area.
 Dauntless (1944)  — See Operation Martlet
 Defoe (1944)  — ineffective SAS reconnaissance around Argentan in Normandy
 Detroit (1944)  — American airdrop in Normandy
 Dingson (1944)  — Free French SAS operation around Vannes to disrupt communications and arm local Resistance
 Lost (1944)  — French SAS team in Brittany to link with Dingson
 Epsom (1944)  — British assault west of Caen, Normandy, aimed at capturing the city
 Martlet (1944)  — Supporting operation launched the day before Operation Epsom
 Goodwood (1944)  — British armoured assault to capture the Bourguébus Ridge, destroy German armoured reserves and support Operation Atlantic
 Atlantic (1944)  — Operation to capture the remaining sections of the German-occupied city of Caen. Launched side by side with Operation Goodwood
 Greenline (1944)  — diversionary attack by XII Corps designed to draw German attention away from the upcoming assault, out of the Orne bridgehead, codenamed Goodwood.
 Pomegranate (1944)  — diversionary attack by XXX Corps designed to draw German attention away from the upcoming assault, out of the Orne bridgehead, codenamed Goodwood.
 Grouse (1944)  — advance towards Tinchebray (also called Wallop).
 Jupiter  — British attack to occupy and hold Hill 112, near Caen
 Kitten (1944)    — British and Canadian advance to the Seine.
 Mulberry (1944) — creation of safe anchorages using block ships
 Mitten (1944)  — elimination of German position at Chateau de la Ronde
 Neptune — landing phase of Overlord 
 Accumulator (1944)  — diversionary naval operation near to the Channel Islands
 Bravado (1944)  — mine-laying around Kiel Canal to inhibit German naval reaction
 Gambit (1944)  — use of X-Craft midget submarines as navigation beacons off Sword and Juno beaches
 Maple  — Allied naval minelaying operations to inhibit German naval reaction
 Neptune (Seine)  — 43rd (Wessex) Division's assault crossing of Seine
 Paddle (1944)   — Canadian pursuit of German forces
 Peppermint (1944)  — Precautions against German spreading of radioactive poison materials
 Pirate (1944)   — Anglo-Canadian training exercise prior to D-Day, at Studland Bay, England
 Pluto (1944)  — construction of undersea oil pipelines between England and France
 Postage Able (1944)  — landing beach surveys using X-Craft and divers
 Smash (1944)  — British training exercise prior to D-Day, at Studland Bay, Dorset, England
 Spring   — Canadian attack on high ground, south of Caen
 Sussex  — insertion of French OSS operatives into France to report German troop movements
 Tiger (1944)  — Allied training exercise prior to D-Day, near Slapton, England
 Tonga  — British airdrop in Normandy, east of the Orne River
 Mallard (Airdrop)  — British airlanding follow-up to Tonga
 Totalize (1944)     — Allied advance to capture highground north of the city of Falaise
 Tractable (1944)   — Attack to capture the city of Falaise, and to help close the Falaise pocket
 Trousers (1944)   — Anglo-Canadian training exercise prior to D-Day, near Slapton, England
 Walter (1944)  — tidy-up operation, using two brigades.
 Wallop (1944)  — advance towards Tinchebray (also called Grouse).
 Windsor (1944)  — capture of Carpiquet.
 Dickens (1944)  — highly successful French SAS operation around Nantes to disrupt rail lines, gather intelligence and support local Resistance
 Pegasus (1944) — Allied rescue of troops after failure of Market Garden
 Queen (1944) — aerial close-support operation in Hurtgen Forest, east of Aachen
 Switchback (1944)   taking of Breskens pocket, first phase of the Battle of the Scheldt.
 Totter (1944)  combined ROC and RAF anti V-1 efforts
 Undergo (1944)   — assault on Calais
 Vitality (1944)  taking of South Beveland, second phase of the Battle of the Scheldt.
 Wacht am Rhein ("Watch on the Rhine") (1944)  — counteroffensive in the Ardennes
 Greif ("Griffin") (1944)  — infiltration using troops disguised in Allied uniforms.
 Stösser (1944)  — airborne drop in support of the Wacht am Rhein.
 Bodenplatte ("Baseplate") (1944)  — Luftwaffe support raids on Allied airbases. Rescheduled to 1 January 1945.
 Wellhit (1944)   — assault on Boulogne

1945
 Amherst (1945)  — French airborne SAS raid in north-east Netherlands
 Anger (1945)  —  cross the Neder Rijn and capture Arnhem
 Barker (1944)  — French SAS operation to protect exposed right flank of US 3rd Army
 Blackcock (1945)  — clearance of the Roer Triangle by the British 2nd Army
 Bremen (1945)  — occupation of Bremen
 Cannonshot (1945)  — crossing the IJssel
 Cleanser (1945)  — advance to the IJsselmeer
 Crosskeys (1945)  — the establishment of allied coastal and minesweeping forces in Danish waters
 Destroyer (1945)  — clearing the "Island"
 Eclipse (1945)   — occupation of north German ports
 Exodus (1945)  — repatriation of POWs
 Goldflake (1945)  — Canadian 1st Corps moves from Italy to northwest Europe under command of Canadian First Army
 Grenade (1945)  —  US Ninth Army advance from the Roer (see also Veritable)
 Howard (1945)  — Special Air Service reconnaissance operation ahead of Canadian 4th Armoured Division advance towards Oldenburg
 Keystone (1945)  — Special Air Service mission to capture bridges over Apeldoorn canal and harass the enemy south of IJsselmeer
 Larkswood (1945)  — Belgian SAS reconnaissance operation ahead of Canadian and Polish units in Holland and Germany
 Manna and Chowhound   — Food droppings in Holland to relieve the Dutch famine.
 Nestegg (1945)  — reoccupation of the Channel Islands
 Nordwind ("North Wind") (1945)  — attempt to open a second front in Alsace
 Placket (1945)  — delivery by sea of essential supplies to Dutch civilians
 Plunder (1945)    — 21st Army Group crossing of the Rhine
 Archway (1945)  — SAS operation to support Plunder and the subsequent advance to Kiel
 Flashpoint  — Ninth US Army element of Plunder
 Torchlight  – British XII Corps element of Plunder
 Turnscrew   – British XXX Corps element of Plunder
 Widgeon  – British 1st Commando Brigade element of Plunder
 Varsity    — airborne element of Plunder
 Schneeman (1945)  — German attempt to open a second front in Netherlands.
 Valediction (1945)   — original plan for Canadian First Army's advance through the Klever Reichswald to Xanten, delayed then renamed Veritable
 Venerable (1945)   — clearance of German garrisons on the Gironde estuary (Operation Independence, revived)
 Jupiter (1945)  — assault on Île d'Oléron
 Veritable (1945)   — Canadian First Army's advance through the Klever Reichswald to Xanten co-ordinated with Grenade (formerly Valediction)
 Blockbuster (1945)   — final phases of Veritable'
 Heather (1945)  — reinforcement of XXX Corps by British 3rd Infantry Division
 Ventilate (1945)  — cancelled assault crossing of the Meuse (Maas'') by British 3rd Infantry Division

See also
List of World War II military operations

References

External links
 WW2DB: List of Axis Operations
 WW2DB: List of Allied Operations

Operation

ca:Operacions de la Segona Guerra Mundial